Suchitel Ávila Casaña (born 1 September 1982) is a Cuban women's basketball player with Capitalinas. She also competes internationally with Cuba women's national basketball team.

She was a member of the team which competed for Cuba at the 2015 Pan American Games, winning a bronze medal.

References

1982 births
Living people
Cuban women's basketball players
Basketball players from Havana
Basketball players at the 2003 Pan American Games
Basketball players at the 2007 Pan American Games
Basketball players at the 2015 Pan American Games
Pan American Games bronze medalists for Cuba
Pan American Games gold medalists for Cuba
Pan American Games medalists in basketball
Central American and Caribbean Games gold medalists for Cuba
Central American and Caribbean Games silver medalists for Cuba
Competitors at the 2006 Central American and Caribbean Games
Competitors at the 2018 Central American and Caribbean Games
Forwards (basketball)
Central American and Caribbean Games medalists in basketball
Medalists at the 2003 Pan American Games
Medalists at the 2015 Pan American Games
21st-century Cuban women